Retail apocalypse refers to the closing of numerous brick-and-mortar retail stores, especially those of large chains, beginning around 2010 and accelerating due to the mandatory closures during the COVID-19 pandemic.

In 2017, over 12,000 physical stores closed due to factors including over-expansion of malls, rising rents, bankruptcies, leveraged buyouts, low quarterly profits outside holiday binge spending, delayed effects of the Great Recession, and changes in spending habits. American consumers have shifted their purchasing habits due to various factors, including experience-spending versus material goods and homes, casual fashion in relaxed dress codes, as well as the rise of e-commerce, mostly in the form of competition from juggernaut companies such as Amazon.com and Walmart. A  2017 Business Insider report  dubbed this phenomenon the "Amazon effect," and calculated that Amazon.com was generating greater than 50% of the growth of retail sales. Dissenting economists and experts asserted that recent retail closures are a market correction, suggesting that "retail apocalypse" is a misleading phrase that instills insecurity in the 16 million U.S. retail workers.

Research published by global retail analyst IHL Group in 2019 suggests that the so-called retail apocalypse narrative was an exaggeration, with "more chains that are expanding their number of stores than closing stores.” That year, retailers in the United States announced 9,302 store closings, a 59% jump from 2018, and the highest number since tracking the data began in 2012.

Corporate bankruptcies and store closings increased significantly from 2020 due to the financial impact of the COVID-19 pandemic, with most retail stores, especially already struggling mall-based retailers, closing for extended periods of time.  J. Crew, Neiman Marcus, Stage Stores, JCPenney, and Tuesday Morning were among the retailers to file for bankruptcy during the pandemic.

The most productive retailers in North America during contemporary retail apocalypses are discount superstores (Walmart, Target), low-cost "fast-fashion" brands (Zara, Uniqlo, Cotton On, H&M), off-price department stores (Ross, Marshalls, Burlington), pet stores (PetSmart, Petco) and dollar stores (Dollar General, Dollar Tree, Family Dollar).

History

"Retail apocalypse" appeared in print in an early 1990s essay by It's Not My Department! author Peter Glen. The term became controversial as used by media to refer to multiple brick-and-mortar store closures resulting from shifts in consumer spending.

The phrase began gaining widespread usage in 2017 following multiple announcements from many major retailers of plans to either discontinue or greatly scale back a retail presence, including companies such as H.H. Gregg, Family Christian Stores and The Limited all going out of business entirely. The Atlantic described the phenomenon as "The Great Retail Apocalypse of 2017," reporting nine retail bankruptcies and several apparel companies having their stock hit new lows, including that of Lululemon, Urban Outfitters, and American Eagle. Credit Suisse, a major global financial services company, predicted that 25% of U.S. malls remaining in 2017 could close by 2022.

Since at least 2010, various economic factors have resulted in the closing of many stores in North America, the United Kingdom, and Australia, particularly in the department store industry. For example, Sears Holdings had more than 3,500 stores and 355,000 employees in 2006. By the end of 2016, Sears operated 1,430 stores. In October 2018, Sears filed for bankruptcy and announced it would close an additional 142 of its 687 stores. At the time of filing, Sears had 68,000 employees.

From 2017, the phrase is frequently applied to brick-and-mortar closures in retail, with the retail apocalypse creating a domino effect on manufacturers and suppliers; Hasbro, for example, cited the losses of the ToysЯus chain as a major cause for lost revenue and layoffs the company imposed in October 2018.

A 2019 analysis conducted by IHL Group international research and advisory firm found that when a retailer closes many stores, it indicates more about the individual retailer rather than the retail industry overall. In 2019, the 20 stores announcing the most closures represent 75% of all closures. IHL found that for each retailer closing stores in 2019, more than five retail chains are opening stores, an increase from the 3.7 ratio of 2018. IHL also reported that the number of chains adding stores in 2019 had increased 56%, while the number of closing stores decreased by 66% in the last year.

As of May 2020, bankruptcies and store closings were expected to intensify due to widespread business closures and the resulting financial impact of the COVID-19 pandemic. J. Crew, Neiman Marcus, Stage Stores, JCPenney, and Tuesday Morning were among the first major retailers to file for bankruptcy during the pandemic.

Factors

Shift to e-commerce
The main factor cited in the closing of retail stores in the retail apocalypse is the shift in consumer habits towards online shopping. Holiday sales for e-commerce increased by an estimated 11% to 20% from 2015 to 2016. The same year, brick-and-mortar stores saw an overall increase of only 1.6%, with physical department stores experiencing a 4.8% decline.

Oversupply of shopping malls
Another factor is an over-supply of malls as the growth rate of malls in North America between 1970 and 2015 was over twice the growth rate of the population. In 2004, Malcolm Gladwell wrote that investment in malls was artificially accelerated when the United States Congress introduced accelerated depreciation into the tax code in 1954. Despite the construction of new malls, mall visits declined by 50% between 2010 and 2013 with further declines reported in each successive year.

Experience economy

A major reported contributing factor to the supposed retail decline is an on-going "restaurant renaissance" – a shift in consumer spending habits for their disposable income from material purchases such as clothing towards dining out and travel.

Shrinking middle class
Another cited factor is the "death of the American middle class" (declining real wages and rising costs creating a middle-class squeeze), resulting in large-scale closures of retailers such as Macy's and Sears which traditionally relied on spending from this market segment. Particularly in rural areas, variety stores such as Dollar General, Dollar Tree, and Family Dollar, once thought to be unaffected by the apocalypse since they have continued growing rapidly, are now perceived as being at best a symptom of the phenomenon, and at worst a direct cause of rural, independent retailers collapsing, unable to compete with the lower margins that national chains can sustain.

Poor management
Poor retail management coupled with an overcritical eye towards quarterly dividends  cause a lack of accurate inventory control, so the sales floor suffers from underperforming merchandise and out-of-stock merchandise, creating a poor shopping experience for customers. The focus on short-term balance sheets induces management to understaff retail stores in order to keep profits high. Furthermore, many long-standing chain retailers are overloaded with debt, often from leveraged buyouts from private equity firms, which hinders the profitable operation of retail chains.

COVID-19 pandemic

The COVID-19 pandemic exacerbated many issues affecting retailers, as many were forced to shut down due to non-pharmaceutical interventions that were issued in an effort to mitigate the pandemic.

At the same time, online shopping has been booming during the coronavirus-related lockdown. Most of the major e-commerce retailers in the United States were classified as essential businesses and were not required to shut down. Buyers stated that they would deliberately buy products from such categories as food and drinks, hygiene, household cleaning, clothing, health, and consumer electronics online rather than in person due to COVID-19. The outbreak is said to have changed shopping behavior permanently: in the US, 29% of surveyed consumers stated that they had no intention to ever go back to offline shopping. In the UK, this number reached 43%.

In June 2020, retail research firm Coresight reported that they estimated that the number of store closures due to the pandemic and ensuing recession would exceed the 2019 record of 9,302.

Coresight Research data later indicated that store closures had reduced by 49% from 2020 to 2021, with store openings increased by 36% over the previous year. Clothing and accessories accounted for 43% of retail closures in 2021. In July 2022, the analytics firm published findings that store openings had exceeded store closings for the first half of 2022, and that there were 10% fewer closings and 3% fewer openings than in 2021.

Major retail bankruptcies 2011–2021
Below is a sample of the numerous retail chains that declared bankruptcy during the ten-year period, 2011–2021.

Strategies 
Researchers have identified customer experience and brand reputation as two factors that can influence whether a retailer will survive. Some more established retailers like Toys "R" Us may not have been as responsive to changing trends in consumer behavior. Some researchers have made recommendations based on trends and technologies to improve the outlook for traditional brick and mortar retailers.

Employing technology, Ikea became one of the first retailers to use Apple's ARKit to develop an augmented reality app that allowed customers to visualize 3D renderings of Ikea products as they would appear in a certain room or place. Macy's, American Eagle, Nike and Sephora were reported to be implementing various technologies to integrate digital experiences to improve consumers' physical shopping experiences. Sephora has installed smart mirrors that use augmented reality technology to allow customers to try on makeup. Walmart automated some aspects of its supply chain, while Kohl's streamlined its retail presence, reducing the size of some stores from 90,000 to between 60,000 and 35,000 square feet. starting the use of robots to help clean and stock shelves. Company executives have said robots lower costs and improve efficiency, but employees report they don't like working with robots. Lowe's has been using LowesBot to help customers find items.

According to a 2018 study from the International Council of Shopping Centers, new stores can increase traffic to retailer websites by an average of 37% and drive up share of web traffic within that market by 27% in what is called a "halo effect". Prior to the onset of the COVID-19 pandemic, Forbes outlined several aspects that aid retail survival, highlighting brand reputation as the topmost factor. In February 2020, Monash University in Australia underlined the three key factors for a healthy survival during an apparent retail apocalypse as delivering a "great in-store retail experience", customer-targeted stock offerings, and "seamless omnichannel integration".

See also 

Dead mall
Direct-to-consumer
Economic history of the United States
Experience economy
Pop-up shop

References

Further reading
 Videos

External links
Brian Sozzi, Coach CEO Perfectly Explains What Must Be Done to Survive Retail Apocalypse thestreet.com September 8, 2017
The Death Knell for the Bricks-and-Mortar Store? Not Yet MATTHEW SCHNEIER, New York Times, November 13, 2017
What It's Like to Work in the Last Big Store in a Dying Mall Washington Post/Newser, Kate Seamons, January 2, 2018

2016 in economics
2017 in economics
2018 in economics
2019 in economics
2020 in economics
2021 in economics
2022 in economics
2023 in economics
Economic problems
Economic history of the United States
History of retail in the United States
Economic impact of the COVID-19 pandemic
Urban decay